The Tramways and Public Companies (Ireland) Act 1883 a development of several earlier acts that was designed to facilitate the construction of economical railway infrastructure in rural Ireland.

History
Earlier acts 1860 and 1861 had allowed for promoters to present their schemes to the Lord Lieutenant of Ireland subject to approval by the relevant Grand Juries.  The Lord Lieutenant would create at Order in Council to be confirmed by an Act of Parliament.  The Relief and Distress act of 1880 allowed from contributions from Baronies. This 1883 act gave Grand Juries the power to determine which Baronies were chargeable, made treasury loans available and allowed for loss making concerns to become the property of the local authority.

Impact
 of railway were constructed under the act.

Further reading

References

 

Rail transport in Ireland